Robert Powers may refer to:

 Robert B. Powers (1900–1976), American police officer
 Robert T. Powers, American mathematician
 John Robert Powers (1892–1977), American actor and talent agent

See also
 Robert Power (disambiguation)
 Robert Bowers (disambiguation)